The Raising Cane's River Center Arena (originally the Riverside Centroplex Arena and commonly known as the River Center Arena) is a multi-purpose arena in Baton Rouge, Louisiana, in the United States. The arena can be combined with the exhibition hall to create more than 100,000 square feet (10,000 m2) of contiguous convention or exhibit space. The arena which opened in 1977 presents concerts, sporting events, theater events, trade shows, and family shows, with seating for up to 10,400 for concerts (permanent and floor seats), 8,900 for sporting events (permanent seats) and 4,500 for theatre events. Besides sporting events, the arena hosts the annual Louisiana Senior Beta Club Convention.

In 2016, Raising Cane's Chicken Fingers signed a 10-year naming rights agreement for the arena.

Teams
The arena has been home to multiple sports teams based in Baton Rouge. From 1996 to 2003, it was home to the Baton Rouge Kingfish hockey team of the (ECHL). Also during that time, the arena was home to the Baton Rouge Bombers indoor soccer team of the (EISL) from (1997-1998). The venue was home to two professional arena football teams, the Louisiana Bayou Beast of the (IPFL) in (1999) and the Baton Rouge Blaze of the (af2) in (2001). In 2022-23, the arena will host 3 exhibition games as a test for possible expansion into the Federal Prospects Hockey League.

See also
Raising Cane's River Center
List of music venues

References

External links
Venue website

Basketball venues in Baton Rouge, Louisiana
Baton Rouge Blaze
Baton Rouge Bombers
Baton Rouge Kingfish arenas
Convention centers in Louisiana
Indoor arenas in Baton Rouge, Louisiana
Indoor arenas in Louisiana
Indoor ice hockey venues in Louisiana
Indoor soccer venues in Louisiana
Sports venues in Baton Rouge, Louisiana
Tourist attractions in Baton Rouge, Louisiana
Volleyball venues in Louisiana
Wrestling venues in Louisiana
Sports venues completed in 1977
Music venues in Louisiana
1977 establishments in Louisiana